Zohar Solomon is a former Israeli footballer who is most famous for playing in Maccabi Netanya, where he was an important part in the club's first two historic championships.

Honours
Israeli Premier League (2):
1970–71, 1973–74

References

Living people
Israeli Jews
Israeli footballers
Maccabi Netanya F.C. players
Hapoel Hadera F.C. players
Association football midfielders
Year of birth missing (living people)